The Ili marinka (Schizothorax pseudoaksaiensis) is a species of ray-finned fish in the genus Schizothorax from central Asia and western China.

References 
 

Schizothorax
Taxa named by Solomon Herzenstein
Fish described in 1889